Scott Karl Nicholls (born 16 May 1978) is a motorcycle speedway rider from England, who has won the British Championship seven times, and was a full participant in the Speedway Grand Prix series between 2002 and 2008. He is also a speedway commentator.

Career 
Born in Ipswich, Nicholls began his speedway career in grasstrack racing becoming National Schoolboy champion in 1993. His first international appearance came in 1996 when he was selected to ride for Great Britain in the Speedway World Cup final. He then became British Under-21 Champion in 1998 and again in 1999.

His first experience of the Speedway Grand Prix series came with a wild card ride in Britain, with similar rides following in 2000 and 2001. He qualified as a full-time Grand Prix rider in 2002 and capped that season with a second place in the season ending event in Australia. That year he also won the first of his six British Championships. His sixth British Championship win occurred in 2011.

Nicholls was the most successful ever Coventry Bees captain, skippering them to five trophies in three seasons between 2004 and 2007, including two Elite League championships. He rode for Eastbourne Eagles in 2008. Despite quitting the British Elite League to reduce his racing schedule in 2009, Nicholls returned to the Coventry Bees in May 2009 as temporary cover for the injured Olly Allen.

Nicholls led his home club, the Ipswich Witches for the 2010 Elite League season, as well as riding for Vargarna in the Swedish league and Miskolc, a Hungarian team in the Polish league. With Ipswich dropping down a division, Nicholls signed for Swindon Robins for 2011.  After an unsuccessful spell with the Robins, Nicholls returned to parent club Coventry Bees for the 2012 season, in which he won the Olympique individual meeting at Monmore Green Stadium, staying with the Bees in 2013. From 2013 he made himself unavailable for the Great Britain team, but reversed his decision in 2016. He signed to ride for Belle Vue Aces in 2014 and extended his contract in 2015. After spending 2017 with Rye House Rockets, he started the 2018 SGB Premiership season with them, and rode for Peterborough Panthers in the SGB Championship, but after the Rockets folded mid-season, he was signed by Leicester Lions, with whom he stayed for 2019 after they dropped down to the SGB Championship.

Nicholls was appointed captain of the Oxford Cheetahs for the SGB Championship 2022 season. The Cheetahs were returning to action after a 14-year absence from British Speedway. In addition he rode for Peterborough in the SGB Premiership 2022.

In 2023, he re-signed for Oxford Cheetahs for the SGB Championship 2023.

Major results

World individual Championship
1999 Speedway Grand Prix - 27th (3 pts)
2001 Speedway Grand Prix - 33rd (4 pts)
2002 Speedway Grand Prix - 13th (72 pts)
2003 Speedway Grand Prix - 7th (102 pts)
2004 Speedway Grand Prix - 12th (66 pts)
2005 Speedway Grand Prix - 9th (72 pts)
2006 Speedway Grand Prix - 11th (83 pts)
2007 Speedway Grand Prix - 8th (91pts)
2008 Speedway Grand Prix - 9th (77 pts)
2009 Speedway Grand Prix - 15th (45 pts)
2010 Speedway Grand Prix - 24th (4 pts)
2011 Speedway Grand Prix - 20th (5 pts)
2012 Speedway Grand Prix - 24th (7 pts)

Speedway Grand Prix results

World team Championships
2003 Speedway World Cup - 5th
2004 Speedway World Cup - silver medal
2005 Speedway World Cup - 4th
2006 Speedway World Cup - bronze medal
2007 Speedway World Cup - 4th
2008 Speedway World Cup - 5th
2010 Speedway World Cup - 4th
2011 Speedway World Cup - 6th
2012 Speedway World Cup - 5th

Commentary
Nicholls was the lead on-track commentator during the 2022 Speedway Grand Prix series.

See also 
 List of Speedway Grand Prix riders

References 

1978 births
Living people
British speedway riders
English motorcycle racers
Sportspeople from Ipswich
British Speedway Championship winners
Coventry Bees riders
Eastbourne Eagles riders
Ipswich Witches riders
Leicester Lions riders
Oxford Cheetahs riders
Peterborough Panthers riders
Poole Pirates riders